This is a list of the known varieties of snakes in Arkansas

Non-venomous

Venomous

See also

 List of snakes by state (U.S.)

Snakes
Arkansas